Danton Mello (born May 27, 1975) is a Brazilian actor.

Personal life 
Danton Mello has two daughters, Luisa (2001) and Alice (2003), from his marriage to Brazilian writer Laura Malin.

Biography 
His debut novels occurred in 1985, at the age of ten, as the little  Cuca  of The Cat Comedy. In 1988 he made the character "Bruno Meireles", son of Leila (Cássia Kis Magro) and Ivan Meireles (Antônio Fagundes) in the telenovela Vale Tudo. Later, it would act in diverse attractions of the Globe and other emissoras, but without the same prominence.

In 1995, he was the protagonist of the first season of Juvenile novel "Malhação", where he made romantic pair with Juliana Martins. Later, it was transferred to the SBT, where it acted in Dona Anja. He returned to the Globo in 1997 to live one of the central characters of the Hilda Furacão miniseries.
Still in the 90's, he was also presenter of the Globo Ecologia and in September 1998 suffered a serious helicopter accident during a recording for the program together with the reporting team. The helicopter crashed in Monte Roraima. In this accident Danton had internal hemorrhage and later had to move away of the program and also of the novel Torre de Babel in which it was part of the cast.
The following year he participated in the last chapters of Terra Nostra. He remained a prisoner of television for almost three years, when he starred in the novel Jamais Te Esquecerei in SBT.

Back in 2004, Globo co-starred in the second version of the novel Cabocla. And also was one of the protagonists of the special of end of year Running Back. Returning to represent the same paper in the special one exhibited in 2005. In 2006, was the protagonist of Sinhá Moça next to Débora Falabella.

In 2009, lived the antagonist Amithab of Caminho das Índias.

In 2013, he starred in the comedy "[Vai que Dá Certo]", a blockbuster.

In 2015 he appeared in the novel I love Paraisópolis.

Currently it is in the air with the program Tá in the Air, next to Marcelo Adnet and Marcius Melhem.

Television jobs
A Gata Comeu (1985)
Novo Amor (1986)
Mandala (1987)
Vale Tudo (1988)
Tieta (1989)
Despedida de Solteiro (1992)
Guerra Sem Fim (1993)
A Viagem (1994)
Malhação (1995–1996)
Dona Anja (1997)
Furacão (1998)
Torre de Babel (1998)
Terra Nostra (1999)
Jamais Te Esquecerei (2003)
Cabocla (2004)
Sinhá Moça (2006)
Casos e Acasos (2007)
Caminho das Índias (2009)
Tempos Modernos (2010)
Malhação (2011)
Vai que Dá Certo (2013)
O Concurso (2013)
 2015 – O Super Pai.... Diogo
 2016 – Vai que Dá Certo 2 .... Rodrigo
 2017 – Os Penetras 2 – Quem Dá Mais?

External links
 

1975 births
Living people
People from Minas Gerais
Brazilian people of Portuguese descent
Brazilian male film actors
Brazilian male telenovela actors